Bashgyukh may refer to:
Bashgyukh, Shirak Province, Armenia
Akunk, Kotayk, Armenia
Saralanj, Shirak, Armenia